Different Tacos is a 1996 compilation album by Texas-based blues rock band The Fabulous Thunderbirds. The album features a collection of rarities, B-sides and outtakes from their first four albums. It also contains live tracks from various UK tours.

Track listing

 "Can't Tear It Up Enuff" (Kim Wilson) – 2:45 
 "You're Humbuggin'" (Miller, Morgan) – 2:41
 "My Babe" (Ron Holden) – 2:24
 "Feelin' Good" (Herman Parker) – 5:20 
 "Found a New Love" (Wilson) – 3:16 
 "Introduction of Band by C-Boy Bottom Line Austin" – 0:20 
 "Bad Boy" (Eddie Taylor) – 3:12
 "Scratch My Back" (James Moore) – 5:07
 "She's Tuff" (Jerry McCain) – 3:23
 "Full-Time Lover" (Jones, Frank Scott) – 4:30
 "Introduction of Guest Musicians by Kim Wilson" – 0:35
 "Made in the Shade" – 2:41
 "Crawl" (Shuler, Victorian) – 2:47
 "I Hear You Knockin'" (Miller) – 2:42
 "Mathilda" (George Khoury, Huey Thierry) – 3:22
 "Someday" – 2:14
 "Wait on Time" (Wilson) – 3:10
 "I Got Eyes" (Johnny "Guitar" Watson) – 3:05
 "Things I Forgot to Do" (Wilson) – 3:02
 "Look Whatcha Done" (Magic Sam) – 2:18
 "Please Don't Lie to Me" (Wilson) – 2:08
 "Pocket Rocket" (Wilson) – 4:46

Personnel 
Denny Bruce – producer
Kim Wilson – vocals
Jimmie Vaughan – Guitar
Keith Ferguson - bass
Mike Buck – drums, tracks 4,17, and 22
Fran Christina - drums, all other tracks
Bill Campbell – rhythm guitar
Al Copley – piano
Billy Cross – photography
Joe Gastwirt – mastering
Heather Harris – design, photography
Doug James – baritone saxophone
Kim King – Engineer
Johnny Nicholas – piano, backing vocals
Greg Piccolo – tenor saxophone

References

External links
Official Site

1996 compilation albums
The Fabulous Thunderbirds albums
Albums produced by Denny Bruce